The 1985 Virginia Slims of Pennsylvania, also known as the VS of Pennsylvania, was a women's tennis tournament played on indoor carpet courts at the Hershey Racquet Club in Hershey, Pennsylvania in the United States. It was the third edition of the tournament, which was part of the 1984 Virginia Slims World Championship Series, and was played from February 25 through March 3, 1985. Unseeded Robin White won the singles title.

Finals

Singles
 Robin White defeated  Anne Minter 6–7, 6–2, 6–2

Doubles
 Mary Lou Piatek /  Robin White defeated  Lea Antonoplis /  Wendy White 6–4, 7–6

Notes

References

External links
 International Tennis Federation (ITF) tournament edition details

Virginia Slims of Pennsylvania
Virginia Slims Of Pennsylvania, 1985
Virginia Slims Of Pennsylvania
Virginia Slims Of Pennsylvania